Tourist attractions  in the English county of Somerset include:

See also
 :Category:Tourist attractions in Somerset
List of places of interest in Bath, Somerset

 
Tourist attractions
Somerset